József Szabó (born 10 March 1969) is a retired Hungarian swimmer. He competed in three individual events at the 1988 Olympics and won a gold medal in the 200 m breaststroke; he placed fourth in the 400 m and 24th in the 200 m medley events. Between 1986 and 1989 he won two gold, one silver and one bronze medals in those three events at the world and European championships. In 2012 he was inducted into the International Swimming Hall of Fame.

See also
 List of members of the International Swimming Hall of Fame

References

1969 births
Living people
Swimmers from Budapest
Hungarian male swimmers
Olympic swimmers of Hungary
Swimmers at the 1988 Summer Olympics
Male breaststroke swimmers
Olympic gold medalists for Hungary
World Aquatics Championships medalists in swimming
European Aquatics Championships medalists in swimming
European champions for Hungary
Medalists at the 1988 Summer Olympics
Olympic gold medalists in swimming